Cornwallis is a western coastal settlement of West Auckland, Auckland, New Zealand and forms part of the Waitākere Ranges Regional Park, bordering the Manukau Harbour. It is situated on the Karangahape Peninsula (previously called the Puponga Peninsula) between the Kakamatua Inlet and Cornwallis Bay to the east. It was the site of the first European settlement in the Auckland Region, a timber and trading port that failed in the 1840s.

Geography 

Cornwallis is located on the Karangahape Peninsula, 2.7 km peninsula, extending from the Kakamatua Inlet, south to Puponga Point and Lady Bell Point, and northeast to Mill Bay.

The Cornwallis coastal area is dominated by pōhutukawa/rata sheltered coastal fringe forest. Higher elevation areas of the peninsula and mainlands are predominantly a warm lowlands pūriri forest.

History

Pre-European history

The Karangahape Peninsula is formed from volcanic-derived sandstones and siltstones, which were laid down during the Otaian age in the Lower Miocene, between 21.7 and 18.7 million years ago. Cornwallis was known in pre-colonial times by Tāmaki Māori as Karangahape, named after the tohunga of the Tainui waka and meaning "Hape's chant of welcome". Karangahape was a significant coastal settlement, part of the traditional rohe of the Te Kawerau ā Maki iwi, and alongside nearby Parau, Laingholm and Waima, was an important link facilitating trade between the Waitakere Ranges and the Manukau Harbour. The traditional trail leading from the peninsula to central Auckland was also named after Hape, becoming the namesake of Karangahape Road.

Apihai Te Kawau, paramount chief of Ngāti Whātua Ōrākei, settled on the peninsula in the early 19th century, during which the Karangahape Pā was created on the peninsula. The pā, located at a beach headland north of the Cornwallis Wharf, is one of the few examples of pā that used earthwork ditch defenses in West Auckland. After 1837 and the end of the Musket Wars, most members of Ngāti Whātua returned to settle in Onehunga and Māngere.

European settlement

In 1835 Australian timber merchant Thomas Mitchell, helped by William White of the English Wesleyan Mission, negotiated with Apihai Te Kawau for the purchase of 40,000 acres of land in return for less than 166 pound sterling, 1,000 pounds of tobacco, 100 dozen pipes, and six muskets. In 1836 Mitchell moved to the peninsula as the first permanent European resident in Auckland, however after establishing his timber mill, drowned months later. Captain William Cornwallis Symonds purchased the land from Mitchell's widow for 500 pounds, naming the area Cornwallis after his late uncle, Charles Cornwallis, 1st Marquess Cornwallis, former Viceroy of India. Te Kawau was dissatisfied with the purchase, as Māori had become more aware at the great inequalities between the land value and what they had been compensated for, as well as the state of the tobacco, which arrived mouldy, and had never been compensated for by Mitchell or Symonds. After the Treaty of Waitangi, Symonds purchased an additional 3,000 acres from Te Kawau for the settlement.

Symonds formed a company to create a large-scale settlement at Cornwallis, helped by partners Theophilus Heale, a British captain, and Dudley Sinclair, heir of Sir George Sinclair, who wanted to regain his family fortune through this venture. The three men attempted to establish Cornwallis Settlement in 1839 as a logging, trading and shipping settlement, subdividing 220 plots of land in the area. Cornwallis was advertised as an idyllic and fertile to Scottish settlers, and after 88 plots of land had been sold, the settler ship Brilliant left Glasgow in 1840. While the ship made its voyage, the colonial government examined Symonds pre-treaty deal with Ngāti Whātua, and was dissatisfied with the deal, only allowing settlers rights of occupancy of two years while a decision could be reached, and not allowing any logging to be done on the land.

After a 10-month journey, 31 settler families arrived at Cornwallis, finding no sign of settlement in the area. Māori who attended the Anglican mission on Āwhitu Peninsula to the south took pity at the settlers, helping them build 25 whare out of nīkau a day after the settlers arrived, with both Symonds and the Māori members of the mission supplying the settlers with wood and supplies for months, however no land grants to the settlers were made, resulting in anger. In November 1841 Symonds drowned, and the leadership of the settlement was taken up by Scottish settler Lachlan McLachlan, who had little information about Symonds' original settlement plans.

In May 1842 the steam sawmill arrived in Cornwallis, and a hotel named The Bird in the Hand (West Auckland's first) opened at the township to service the timber milling and shipping industries. Timber milling in the area was unsuccessful, due to the high cost compared to timber milled elsewhere (such as on Waiheke Island), and government restrictions on the size of timber that could be felled hampered efforts. By mid-1843, timber trade from Cornwallis had steeply fallen, with the hotel closing. Many settlers left the settlement, frustrated at a lack of land or income. In 1844, Lachlan McLachlan, frustrated at the company's lack of support for the settlers, challenged Sinclair to a duel, later confronting him in his home and beating him with a horsewhip. Sinclair committed suicide a few weeks after the incident. Later that year, the colonial government granted the settlers a quarter of the land originally bought by Symonds, taken from Crown holdings elsewhere in the region. Some of the early Cornwallis settler families moved to Onehunga after its establishment later in the 1840s.

In 1860 the Crown reduced the size of the company's land holdings to 1,927 acres around the Karangahape Peninsula, after which Heale sold the steam mill boiler for use in the copper mine on Kawau Island. In February 1863 HMS Orpheus ran aground at a sandbar in the mouth of the Manukau Harbour, killing many of the sailors. John Kilgour and his wife Ellen nursed many of the survivors of the Orpheus at their home in Cornwallis. While ownership of the land was still disputed, a timber mill run by Matthew Roe operated out of the Kakamatua Inlet in the 1860s/1870s. Ownership of the peninsula was not settled until after the 1880s, when John McLachlan, Lachlan's son, purchased the land on Karangahape Peninsula.

When John McLachlan died in 1909 he gifted the land to the Auckland region as a public park. In 1919 a memorial was erected at the highest point of the peninsula in memory of McLachlan's mother Isabella and the Cornwallis settlers, which was stuck by lightning and badly damaged in 1927.

Coastal holiday settlement

From 1917, the Auckland Council began allowing rental baches and holiday homes to be built near the shore at Cornwallis. In 1926, the Auckland Harbour Board built a wharf at Cornwallis, as a location where passengers travelling on the Manukau Harbour to Onehunga could safely disembark. By the 1950s and 60s, a thriving community of holidaymakers had developed, some living permanently in the baches. In April 1969, the Auckland City Council ended the rental agreement with the community, leading to legal disputes with the residents. By 1978, the final shoreside bach was removed.

In 1998 the original wharf was demolished, replaced in the following year with a  wharf, today a popular fishing spot. Cornwallis is the filming location for the Canadian/New Zealand drama The Sounds (2020).

Demographics

It is part of the wider Waitakere Ranges South statistical area.

Cornwallis had a population of 156 at the 2018 New Zealand census, a decrease of 12 people (-7.1%) since the 2013 census, and an increase of 3 people (2.0%) since the 2006 census. There were 66 households. There were 81 males and 75 females, giving a sex ratio of 1.08 males per female. The median age was 52.5 years (compared with 37.4 years nationally), with 18 people (11.5%) aged under 15 years, 24 (15.4%) aged 15 to 29, 87 (55.8%) aged 30 to 64, and 30 (19.2%) aged 65 or older.

Ethnicities were 90.4% European/Pākehā, 11.5% Māori, 3.8% Pacific peoples, 1.9% Asian, and 3.8% other ethnicities (totals add to more than 100% since people could identify with multiple ethnicities).

Although some people objected to giving their religion, 65.4% had no religion, 23.1% were Christian, 1.9% were Buddhist and 3.8% had other religions.

Of those at least 15 years old, 42 (30.4%) people had a bachelor or higher degree, and 15 (10.9%) people had no formal qualifications. The median income was $33,100, compared with $31,800 nationally. The employment status of those at least 15 was that 60 (43.5%) people were employed full-time, 36 (26.1%) were part-time, and 3 (2.2%) were unemployed.

References

External links
Photographs of Cornwallis held in Auckland Libraries' heritage collections.

1841 establishments in New Zealand
Beaches of the Auckland Region
Populated places around the Manukau Harbour
Populated places in the Auckland Region
Waitākere Ranges
Waitākere Ranges Local Board Area
West Auckland, New Zealand